William Tell Coleman (1824–1893) was an American pioneer in the settlement of California.

Early life
William Tell Coleman was born in Cynthiana in Harrison County, Kentucky on February 29, 1824. He was educated at St. Louis University in Missouri.

Committees of Vigilance
In 1849, Coleman arrived in California and eventually settled in San Francisco, where he engaged in the shipping and commission business. Coleman was a leading figure in both the 1851 and 1856 Committees of Vigilance, which usurped civic power in order to drive out the Democratic Party machine and ostensibly to establish law and order. Under Coleman, these committees ignored habeas corpus, conducted secret trials, lynchings, and deportations, and raised a militia. The 1856 Committee of Vigilance disbanded, but after transferring power to the new People's Party, which soon merged with the Republican Party and controlled San Francisco until 1867.

Shipping

After opening a branch in New York City, Coleman established a steamship line between that city and San Francisco in 1856. In 1857 he moved to New York and conducted his business from that city until 1864.

One of Coleman's most noteworthy achievements was the embellishment and extension of the town of San Rafael, California.

Committee of Safety
After a protest in sympathy with the Great Railroad Strike of 1877 turned into an anti-Asian riot, Coleman again mobilized troops to quell the unrest. This time, however, he and his colleagues determined that extra-legal vigilante action was not called for. Coleman formed the Committee of Safety as a supplementary force to the city police (which was doubled in strength during the unrest). Fearing that the Committee of Safety troops would only exacerbate violence and disorder, they were not given firearms. Instead, they were armed with pick handles and became known as the "Pick Handle Brigade." Coleman's concern was less for the well-being of the local Chinese community than fear that a working class party would take power in San Francisco. Nevertheless, the Workingman's Party was formed under the leadership of Denis Kearney. Its slogan was "The Chinese Must Go!" and the party helped foster the racism and political momentum that culminated with the Chinese Exclusion Act of 1882.

Borax mining

During the 1880s Coleman was owner of the Harmony Borax Works in Death Valley, operating famous twenty mule teams to carry the product from 1883 to 1889. The borax works in Death Valley were subsequently acquired by Francis Marion Smith to form the Pacific Coast Borax Company. The town named Lila C, California was at the Lila C mine, named by its owner William Tell Coleman, for his daughter, Lila C. Coleman.

Death
William Tell Coleman died at his home in San Francisco on November 22, 1893.

Legacy
The mineral Colemanite was named in his honor.

The actor Gregg Palmer was cast as Coleman in 1958 episode, "Empire of Youth", on the syndicated television anthology series, Death Valley Days, narrated by Stanley Andrews. In the story line, Coleman shuns gambling and prospecting for gold but devotes his talents elsewhere and makes several fortunes in farming and the mining of borax. He was even mentioned in the 1880s as a potential candidate for U.S President but did not wish to leave California.

See also
 Twenty-Mule-Team Borax 
 Francis Marion Smith

References

External links
 

People from Cynthiana, Kentucky
1824 births
1893 deaths
Mining in California
California pioneers
American vigilantes
Businesspeople from Kentucky
Saint Louis University alumni
19th-century American businesspeople